The blue-bellied roller (Coracias cyanogaster) is a member of the roller family of  birds which breeds across Africa in a narrow belt from Senegal to northeast Democratic Republic of the Congo. It is resident, apart from some local seasonal movements, in mature moist savannah dominated by Isoberlinia trees.

Taxonomy
The blue-bellied roller was given the binomial name Coracias cyanogaster in 1816 by the French naturalist Georges Cuvier based on "Le Rollier à ventre bleu" that had been described and illustrated by François Levaillant in 1806. The specific epithet combines the Ancient Greek kuanos meaning "dark-blue" with gastēr meaning "belly". Levaillant mistaken believed that the specimen had been collected on the island of Java. The species is resident in West-Africa and the type location was later designated as Senegal. The species is monotypic: no subspecies are recognised.

Description
It has a very dark brown back, buffy or chalky white head, neck and breast, with the rest of the plumage mainly blue. Adults have  tail streamers. Sexes are similar, but the juvenile is a drabber version of the adult.

The blue-bellied roller is striking in its strong direct flight, with the brilliant blues of the wings contrasting with the dark back and cream colored head, and the tail streamers trailing behind.

The call of blue-bellied roller is a harsh clicking ga-ga-ga sound.

Distribution and habitat
This is a common bird of warm open country with some trees. These rollers often perch prominently on trees, posts, or overhead wires, like giant shrikes, whilst watching for the grasshoppers and other large insects on which they feed.

Behaviour and ecology
The display of this bird is a lapwing-like display, with the twists and turns that give this species its English name.  It nests in a hole in a tree - a tree cavity.

Status
Widespread and common throughout its large range, the blue-bellied roller is evaluated as Least Concern on the IUCN Red List of Threatened Species.

In captivity
This species can be kept in captivity and is sometimes seen in zoos, open air aviaries, and similar educational facilities.

References

External links 
 BirdLife Species Factsheet

blue-bellied roller
Birds of West Africa
Birds of Central Africa
blue-bellied roller
blue-bellied roller